Jeff Kelly (born September 7, 1979) is a former American football quarterback in the National Football League. He was drafted in seventh round of the 2002 NFL Draft. He now is head coach of the Saraland High School Spartans, and has compiled a record of 61-29.

References

External links
Just Sport Stats

1979 births
Living people
People from Washington County, Alabama
Players of American football from Alabama
American football quarterbacks
Southern Miss Golden Eagles football players
Seattle Seahawks players